The 1987 World Table Tennis Championships mixed doubles was the 39th edition of the mixed doubles championship.  

Hui Jun and Geng Lijuan defeated Jiang Jialiang and Jiao Zhimin in the final by two sets to one.

Results

See also
List of World Table Tennis Championships medalists

References

-